

This is a list of the National Register of Historic Places listings in Rio Arriba County, New Mexico.

This is intended to be a complete list of the properties and districts on the National Register of Historic Places in Rio Arriba County, New Mexico, United States.  Latitude and longitude coordinates are provided for many National Register properties and districts; these locations may be seen together in a map.

There are 116 properties and districts listed on the National Register in the county, including 3 National Historic Landmarks. One former site on the Register is located within the county.

Current listings

|}

Former listing

|}

See also

 List of National Historic Landmarks in New Mexico
 National Register of Historic Places listings in New Mexico

References

Rio Arriba
Northern Rio Grande National Heritage Area